This table provides an overview of the churches in the Jesuit Missions of the Chiquitos.

Notes

References

Lists of churches
Jesuit churches in Bolivia